{{DISPLAYTITLE:C2-Benzenes}}
The C2benzenes are a class of organic aromatic compounds which contain a benzene ring and two other carbon atoms. For the hydrocarbons with no further unsaturation, there are four isomers. There are three xylenes and one ethylbenzene. The substances are:

Xylenes 
o-xylene (1,2-dimethylbenzene), 
m-xylene (1,3-dimethylbenzene) 
p-xylene (1,4-dimethylbenzene)

Other 
Ethylbenzene (not a true xylene but present in mixtures called "mixed xylenes")
Styrene
Phenylacetylene

Alkylbenzenes
 
Benzene derivatives